The following is a list of massacres that have occurred in North Macedonia and its predecessors:

See also

  
Macedonia
Massacres
Massacres